Die Räuber (The Robbers), Op. 25, is an opera in four acts by Giselher Klebe who also wrote the libretto based on the play by Friedrich Schiller.

It premiered on 3 June 1957 at the Deutsche Oper am Rhein, Düsseldorf. It is dedicated to the memory of Giuseppe Verdi. It was written between 1951 and 1956, and revised in 1961/1962.

Roles
 The old Count von Moor (bass)
 Karl and Franz, his sons (dramatic tenor, character baritone)
 Amalia von Edelreich, old Moor's niece (dramatic soprano)
 Hermann, a nobleman (lyric tenor)
 Schweizer, a libertine, later a robber (character bass)
 A Monk (contralto)
 Daniel, an old servant (lyric tenor)
 The libertines, later robbers; voices (backstage)

Time and place: Germany in the middle of the 18th century

External links
  Detailed information about the work, including scoring and synopsis

German-language operas
Operas by Giselher Klebe
Operas
1957 operas
Operas based on plays
Operas set in Germany
Operas based on works by Friedrich Schiller